Parent is a surname, and may refer to:

Alphonse-Marie Parent (1906–1970), Canadian priest, educator and academic administrator
Antoine Parent (1666–1716), French mathematician
Bernie Parent, Canadian National Hockey League player
Bob Parent (1923–1987), Canadian-born photographer
Bob Parent (born 1958), retired ice hockey player 
Clark Parent, Haitian philosopher and politician
Claude Parent (1923–2016), French architect
Dan Parent, American comic book artist and writer
Elaine Parent (1942–2002), Florida-based criminal, known as "The Chameleon Killer"
Étienne Parent (1802–1874) Canadian journalist and government official
Gail Parent,  American television screenwriter, television producer, and author
Gilbert Parent, (1935–2009) Canadian Member of Parliament
Jacqueline Parent, French actress
Jacques Parent, French Olympic fencer
Jacques Parent (1862–1918), Canadian politician
Leslie Parent, American microbiologist and immunologist 
Kevin Parent (b. 1972), Québécois singer-songwriter
Marc Parent, former director of Montreal Police Service
Mark Parent (b. 1954), former Canadian politician 
Mark Parent (born 1961), American Major League Baseball player
Mary Parent (b. 1968), American film producer and former studio executive
Maury Parent (died 2004), American radio personality
Mimi Parent (1924–2005), Canadian surrealist
Octave Parent (1882–1942), French entomologist
Ryan Parent (b. 1987), Canadian National Hockey League player
Simon-Napoléon Parent (1855–1920), former premier of Quebec
Steven Parent, one of five victims of the Tate murders (1969)